The Cat's Miaow is an indie pop band formed in Melbourne, Australia, in 1992.

Members 
 Kerrie (The Beat Poets, Tra La La) - vocals
 Bart (Blairmailer, Girl of the World, Library Records) - guitar
 Andrew (Blairmailer, The Ampersands) - bass
 Cameron (Girl of the World) - drums

Discography 
 Little Baby Sourpuss cassette (Toytown, 1992)
 Pet Sounds cassette (Toytown, 1992)
 From My Window cassette (Toytown, 1993)
 Contrast Split Singles Club split 7-inch (with Last Party, French Marigold and Maylove) (Contrast, 1992)
 Stereolab/Cat's Miaow split 7-inch (Wurlitzer Jukebox, 1995)
 Cat's Miaow/Stinky Fire Engine split 7-inch (Spit And A Half, 1996)
 A Kiss And A Cuddle CD (Bus Stop, 1996)
 Songs For Girls To Sing CD (Drive-In, 1997)
 The Long Goodbye EP (Darla, 1999)
 A Kiss And A Cuddle CD (with bonus tracks) (Library Records, 2003)

Members of The Cat's Miaow have also released more ambient recordings under the name Hydroplane.

External links 
 http://www.virtual.net.au/~awithy/miaow.htm Official web site
 http://www.twee.net/bands/catsmiaow.html twee.net page

Australian indie pop groups
Victoria (Australia) musical groups
Darla Records artists